Felicity "Fliss" Gibbons (born 9 July 1994) is an English football defender and striker currently playing for Crystal Palace.

Early life
Gibbons was born in Maidstone, England and  began playing football at the age of eight. She played for her youth side the Castle Colts in Kent.

Club career 

Gibbons started her senior career at Charlton Athletic before moving on to Watford F.C. While at Watford she went on a four-month loan at Gillingham W.F.C. in the fall of 2013.  She then moved onto her first spell at Brighton & Hove Albion for the 2014/2015 season. During this season she scored 10 goals in 17 appearances and won the club's Women's Player of the year. In 2016 Gibbons left the Seagulls for the Millwall Lionesses. She then returned to Gillingham L.F.C. for the 2016/2017 season.  While at the Kent club she scored 33 goals in 19 appearances and won the FA WPL Division One South East Top Goal Scorer award. She then rejoined Albion in August 2017 ahead of the club's first-ever season in FA WSL2. Gibbons has been utilized both as a striker and a defender as Brighton & Hove Albion moved up to England's top flight, the FA WSL, for the 2018–19 season.

International career 

Gibbons was part of the England U19 team for the 2012–2013 period.

References

External links

 
 

1994 births
Living people
Brighton & Hove Albion W.F.C. players
Women's Super League players
Women's association football midfielders
Charlton Athletic W.F.C. players
Millwall Lionesses L.F.C. players
Watford F.C. Women players
Gillingham L.F.C. players
Footballers from Kent
Sportspeople from Maidstone
English women's footballers
FA Women's National League players